Grim is the second studio album by Cincinnati, Ohio-based indie rock band Ass Ponys. It was originally released in 1992  on OKra Records, and was re-released by Safe House Records in 1993.

Critical reception

Grim received mixed reviews from critics. Greg Adams of AllMusic gave the album 3 out of 5 stars, writing that "Grim, when it hits its mark, is strong stuff." He added that on the album, "[Ass Ponys singer/songwriter Chuck] Cleaver takes twisted backwoods tales and freak-show tragedies and infuses them with just enough wistful reflection to turn Deliverance-style black humor into sometimes crushingly affecting narratives." In a 3-star (out of 4) review, Greg Kot wrote that the album's "...harmony vocals are plaintive and, on tunes such as "It's Not Happening," just about the prettiest thing you'll hear on a pop record this year."

In 2006, PopMatters John Kenyon criticized the album for what he said was its "muddy production that made finding the hooks in some of the band’s songs an expedition of sorts". Trouser Press was also critical of the album's production, writing that "Maybe it's the occasionally muffled production that takes the fun down a peg, but Grim takes the "more serious" mission too seriously."

Track listing
	Big Rock Ending	– 0:24
	Azalea – 4:13
	It's Not Happening – 	4:32
	No Dope No Cigarettes – 	4:45
	Ballpeen – 	5:58
	Not Since Superman Died – 	2:39
	I Love Bob – 	2:57
	Stupid – 	4:38
	Dirty Backseat Car Thing – 	4:02
	High Heaven – 	4:19
	Julia Pastrana – 	3:31
	Disappointed – 	3:31
	Her Father Was A Sailor – 	5:33
	The Big E – 	4:07
	Good With Guns – 	5:11
	California Bingo – 	5:17

PersonnelAss PonysRandy Cheek –	bass, guitar, vocals
Chuck Cleaver – guitar, vocals
John Erhardt –	bass, guitar, pedal steel, vocals
Dave Morrison – drums, percussionOther'
 Niki Buehrig –	backing vocals
John Curley – engineer, mixing
Jimmy Davidson – producer
Dan Kleingers – drums, percussion, backing vocals
Zy Orange Lyn—fiddle
Gary Shell – engineer, mixing, producer

References

Ass Ponys albums
1992 albums
1993 albums
OKra Records albums